Whites Flat (also known as White Flat) is a rural locality in the Eyre and Western region of South Australia, situated within the District Council of Lower Eyre Peninsula. The boundaries for the locality were formally established in October 2003 for the long established local name; this had originally been named after pastoralist Samuel White.

The main feature of the locality is the Tod Reservoir. It also contains the Tucknott Scrub Conservation Park, which lies in its north-west corner.

Whites Flat Post Office opened on 1 October 1897 In 1915, Whites Flat was described as consisting of a post office and local hall, the latter simultaneously serving as school, church, dance hall and lecture room, for less than a dozen inhabitants. The hall had been built by the local residents with their own labour. The school survived for several decades; in 1942, air raid trenches were dug for the students. In 1950, it was reported that "the tiny little post office at White Flat remains unchanged" and that the writer "would be sorry to see the day of the demolition of this little thatch-roofed place which stands a sentinel of the early days".

The post office at Whites Flat is long closed; however, the building, reputed to be the "smallest post office in Australia" survives, having been relocated to the National Trust of South Australia-owned Koppio Smithy Museum in adjacent Koppio. The White Flat Community Hall remains open to the community today.

See also
List of cities and towns in South Australia

References

Towns in South Australia
Eyre Peninsula